Booby Cay is an island in the Bahamas that lies east of Mayaguana. The island is named after the brown booby population that resides on the island, along with native Cyclura species and invasive goats.

References

Islands of the Bahamas